The 2013 Sacramento Challenger was a professional tennis tournament played on hard courts. It was the ninth edition of the tournament which was part of the 2013 ATP Challenger Tour. It took place in Sacramento, United States between 30 September and 6 October 2013.

Singles main-draw entrants

Seeds

 1 Rankings are as of September 23, 2013.

Other entrants
The following players received wildcards into the singles main draw:
  Collin Altamirano
  Jarmere Jenkins
  Robert Kendrick
  Robert Noah

The following players received entry as an alternate into the singles main draw:
  Daniel Cox

The following players received entry from the qualifying draw:
  Dimitar Kutrovsky
  Thanasi Kokkinakis
  Dennis Nevolo
  Fritz Wolmarans

Champions

Singles

 Donald Young def.  Tim Smyczek, 7–5, 6–3

Doubles

 Matt Reid /  John-Patrick Smith def.  Jarmere Jenkins /  Donald Young, 7–6(7–1), 4–6, [14–12]

External links
Official Website

 
Sacramento Challenger
Sacramento Challenger
Sacramento Challenger